USAfrica Airways was a United States-based airline that operated flights between Washington Dulles International Airport (then called Dulles International Airport) and Johannesburg starting in June, 1994. Its headquarters was in Reston, Virginia, and it had an office in Washington, DC.

Flights refueled in the Cape Verde Islands.  Later, once a week flights were added to Cape Town, which also refueled in the Cape Verde Islands.

The airline was the first U.S. airline flying only international routes since the U.S. airline industry was deregulated in 1978.

The airline operated flights from June 1994 to February 3, 1995.

Fleet

It leased two McDonnell Douglas MD-11 aircraft from American Airlines, registered as N1757A and N1758B.

See also 
 List of defunct airlines of the United States

References

External links

Building an International Airline in The Washington Post
Information about print article in Aviation Week and Space Technology
USAFRICA AIRWAYS NAMES NEW MANAGEMENT TEAM article in JOC.com

Defunct airlines of the United States